Thomas Sullivan Magnum IV is a fictional character on the American television series Magnum, P.I..  As the title suggests, the character Magnum is a private investigator. In the original series, Magnum was portrayed by Tom Selleck. Jay Hernandez portrays the character in the 2018 reboot series.

Magnum, P.I. (1980–1988)

Biography

Early life
Both his father and grandfather were naval officers. He was born in Detroit, but raised in the Tidewater region of Virginia. In high school, his football team won a Virginia State football championship. Some members of his family, including his mother, still reside there (as seen and referenced in various episodes). In addition to English, Magnum speaks Vietnamese and French.

Personality
Magnum was endowed with a rich assortment of personality traits, quirks, and preferences. He was an avid sports fan, not only of baseball (he was a lifelong Detroit Tigers baseball fan), but of American football (having been a former quarterback for the U.S. Naval Academy, he evinced an intense fondness for the annual Army–Navy Game that often worked its way into plotlines), during varied episodes he tried out for a professional football team, coached and played both basketball and softball, and participated in the Ironman Triathlon. Magnum regularly worked out on a surf ski and participated in local competitions, and enjoyed daily swims in the tidal pool off Robin's Nest.

Magnum was originally envisioned as a Bond type but at Selleck's request was made into more of an average "everyman" with numerous character flaws including immaturity, talking in a whiny voice when stressed, overconfidence, being manipulative towards his friends, and often losing many smaller character conflicts in sometimes humiliating ways before solving the case. He often refers in his inner monologue to the "Little voice" within his mind which appears to be a highly advanced form of intuition and has a passing belief in the supernatural after several mysterious experiences.

It became apparent during Season 1 that Magnum was a fan of the bands Styx, Jefferson Starship and Blondie but also admitted to owning cassettes of Bach and Beethoven, mainly to appease Higgins.

His "Stuff"
Magnum's drink of choice was "Old Dusseldorf" in a long-neck bottle, as well as Scotch on the rocks; also he enjoyed sneaking fine wines out of Robin Masters's wine cellar when he believed Higgins was not looking. Among his trademarks was his "stuff", souvenir possessions collected over the years such as baseball bats and gloves, a disturbing looking gorilla mask, and a yellow rubber chicken. He also owned a Beta tape of Stalag 17, his favorite movie. His personal weapon, seemingly carried only when deemed necessary, was a Colt Government Model .45 ACP handgun (as stated in several episodes), Colt Commercial version of the standard military-issue M1911A1 pistol (in actuality, a similar-looking 9mm Star Model BM, as .45 ACP 1911s of the time could not reliably cycle blanks). A genuine Gauguin hung on the wall of the guest house he occupied (in actuality, a composite of two real Gauguin paintings), he had free use of Masters' Ferrari 308 GTS, and he often bartered with Higgins for use of expensive cameras, the tennis courts, and other accoutrements of wealthy living.

Perhaps his most valued possession was his late father's Rolex GMT Master aviator's wristwatch (as depicted in episode 4.01 "Home from the Sea"). Magnum's father was a Naval Aviator killed in the Korean War when Magnum was only five (something that is an anachronism, as the GMT Master was introduced in 1954, too late for both active combat missions and Magnum to have been five when his father died). In early seasons Magnum also wore a Chronosport Sea Quartz 30. He, along with Rick and T.C., wears a team ring with a Croix de Lorraine on it from their time in Vietnam. On a sideboard in his living room he has a picture showing him, T.C., Rick and others in Vietnam.

Birthdate
Magnum's birthdate has been given on multiple occasions, nearly all conflicting:
In the second season episode "Memories are Forever", his driver's license notes it as January 5, 1946. Magnum's PI license is also shown in the fifth season episode "Murder 101", using this date.
In the second season episode "Try to Remember", Magnum, waking up in the hospital with a serious head wound, gives his birthday as August 8, 1944.
In the fourth season episode "Letter to a Duchess", Magnum gives his age as 38, putting his birth date between November 1944 and November 1945, assuming the airdate of the episode corresponds to the in-show date.
In the fourth season episode "On Face Value", Magnum makes a point of being ten and not yet eleven in a flashback to August 4, 1956. This would put his birthday between August 5, 1945 and August 3, 1946.
The seventh season episode "Forty" centers around Magnum's 40th birthday, putting his birth in February 1947, assuming the airdate of the episode corresponds with the in-show date.

Careers

United States Navy

Annapolis
Magnum attended the United States Naval Academy, Class of '67 or '68, depending on the episode referenced. While at the Naval Academy he dated Ginger Grant, no relation to the Gilligan's Island character, who became a professional tennis player and re-entered his life in the episode "Mixed Doubles". Additionally in the episode "From Moscow to Maui", Magnum states that he was the captain of the Annapolis football team during at least one Army–Navy game; Army scored a touchdown early in the first quarter from a play he called.

Active duty
He served ten or more years as an officer in the United States Navy, rising to the rank of lieutenant before resigning from the service in disillusionment in 1979. Magnum was a Vietnam War veteran and a former POW who believed his wife Michelle died in bombing during the final pull-out from Saigon. He served in both the SEALs and Naval Intelligence during his Navy years, and as such maintained many contacts in both "communities". In the episode "Solo Flight" he is seen wearing the rank insignia for a lieutenant commander. By the final episode of Magnum P.I. in 1988, Thomas had decided to return to active duty in the Navy at the rank of commander (O-5).

Military decorations and awards
On his Navy uniform, Magnum wore service ribbons for the Navy Cross, Purple Heart, National Defense Service Medal, Vietnam Service Medal, Gallantry Cross Unit Citation with Palm and Frame, and the Republic of Vietnam Campaign Medal.

Specifically in the season 2 episodes 23/24, "Memories are Forever" parts 1 & 2, we see the uniform Magnum is to wear to Washington, D.C., presented to him by Mac (so it should be correct). The collar has the commander rank, with the Special Warfare insignia with the Navy Cross, Purple Heart, National Defense Service Medal, Vietnam Service Medal with 2 service star, Gallantry Cross Unit Citation with Palm and Frame, and the Republic of Vietnam Campaign Medal.
During the Vietnam War United States Navy SEALs didn't have a specific breast insignia. They wore only the Navy & Marine Corps Parachutist Insignia. So Thomas Magnum is entitled to wear the U.S. Naval Parachutist Insignia, even though he didn't wear it on his uniform.

Private investigator
After leaving the Navy, Magnum became a largely penniless private investigator "beach bum" in Hawaii who, despite irregular employment, managed to secure a cushy job offer about six months after his discharge. He was able to live a comfortable existence thanks to celebrity author Robin Masters, by whom Magnum had been hired to test, on a semi-regular basis, both the security of his estate and the astuteness of his estate's majordomo, Jonathan Quayle Higgins.  The job perks included use of the guest house on his Hawaii estate "Robin's Nest" and use of his red Ferrari 308 GTS in exchange for quality control of the estate security. In the course of the series, Magnum and his friends became involved not only in typical "P.I." cases but also a wide variety of adventures involving espionage, covert operations, paramilitary escapades, and "lifestyles of the rich and famous". The blending of private investigator and beach bum characteristics allowed the frequent addition of a strong comic element into the action-drama-comedy series.

Magnum  extremely disliked being referred to as a "P.I.", "Private Eye", or "Private Detective", and quickly corrected people by saying he was a "Private Investigator". He often appeared in either khaki pleated shorts or blue jeans (Navy-issue swim trunks, or Levis), an Aloha shirt, and Sperry boat shoes or white Puma Easy Rider Sneakers, usually without anything more than ankle socks. He often wore battered baseball caps of his favorite sports team, the Detroit Tigers, and sometimes one from his service in Da Nang (VMO-2).

Relationships

Friends
Magnum regarded friendship as perhaps the most important element of life for him, and the theme of friendship ran throughout the many episodes. His most enduring friendships were with his former Vietnam comrades, Orville Wilbur Richard "Rick" Wright and Theodore "T.C." Calvin, and their friendship not only survived but flourished under the eccentricities each showed the others, and the extreme, sometimes perilous stresses they shared. His other close friendship, of a love-hate nature, was with Jonathan Quayle Higgins III (referred to by T.C. as "Higgy-baby"), the ostensible majordomo of the estate where Magnum was a perennial guest (or in Higgins' view, moocher). Magnum persistently tried to foil Higgins' efforts to impose an orderly regimen on Magnum's disordered lifestyle, as they traded verbal jabs and one-ups-manship games with each other.

Magnum lived in the guest house on Robin Masters' estate, Robin's Nest, as part of his being in-charge of security on the estate, which likely explains the almost unlimited access to the Ferrari.

Other friendships were woven throughout his encounters in the series. He continuously took advantage of Lieutenant "Mac" MacReynolds, a Navy officer and intelligence source for many of his cases, but was devastated when Mac was killed in an assassination attempt on Magnum by "Ivan," a Soviet intelligence operative who had also overseen the torture of Magnum when he was a POW in Vietnam. For almost every season in the series, Magnum's investigations paralleled and sometimes crossed those of Honolulu Police Lieutenant Tanaka, with the obvious respect they held for each other going well beyond a shared enjoyment of the Detroit Tigers. Magnum maintained friendships with women as well, most notably Assistant District Attorney Carol Baldwin and Lieutenant (later Lieutenant Commander) Maggie Poole, MacReynolds' successor. Magnum was no less apt to exploit his friendship with Carol or Maggie as he was his male friends, and no less loyal. Numerous episode plots featured "old friends" calling on Magnum for help, requests he always honored, even when helping conflicted with his best judgment.

Family
After Magnum's father's death, his mother Katherine married Frank Peterson.  They had a son Joey, who ran away for reasons unknown before dying while serving in Vietnam.  Magnum also has an aunt, Phoebe Sullivan, who is a novelist, and a cousin named Karen.

While serving in South Vietnam, Magnum married a beautiful French-Eurasian nurse named Michelle Hue, the widow of North Vietnamese General Nguyen Hue. Magnum left Vietnam believing Michelle was killed during the 1975 evacuation of Saigon. Her death was staged because General Hue had resurfaced and Michelle knew Magnum wouldn't leave Vietnam without her. Michelle was a devout Catholic and in the eyes of the church Hue was her husband, not Magnum.

In "Memories Are Forever" (November 1981), Magnum was reunited with his presumed dead wife and learned the truth behind her deception. Unbeknownst to Magnum at the time, they conceived a daughter during that reunion. The child, Lily Catherine, appeared in five episodes ("Little Girl Who", "Limbo", "Infinity and Jelly doughnuts," "Unfinished Business", and "Resolutions"). Although she was raised as the daughter of General Hue, Lily Catherine learned Magnum-related things from Michelle, such as "Detroit Tigers" and "Rick, T.C., Thomas". By "Resolutions" (May 1988), General Hue's enemies had killed Hue, Michelle, and Michelle's second husband, Edward Durant. Lily Catherine was presumed dead and was reunited with Magnum, who returned to his career as a Naval Intelligence officer to protect her.

Magnum P.I. (2018–present)

Jay Hernandez portrays Thomas Magnum in the 2018 reboot of the series. In the reboot, Thomas Magnum is a decorated ex-Navy SEAL who returns home to become a private investigator. He gets help on cases from two of his friends from the Navy, Theodore "TC" Calvin and Orville "Rick" Wright, and from former MI6 agent Juliet Higgins. In season two, Higgins becomes Magnum's partner. Later in the season, Magnum asks Higgins to marry him in order for her to stay in the country after her visa expires. She initially accepts his offer, but later reverses her decision. Hernandez also played Magnum in a crossover episode with Hawaii Five-0.

Military decorations and awards 
On his U.S. Navy uniform, Magnum wore in the 2018 reboot series the following medals and naval insignia:

References

External links

Magnum Mania

Fictional characters from Virginia
Fictional private investigators
Fictional United States Navy SEALs personnel
Fictional Vietnam War veterans
Magnum, P.I. characters
Television characters introduced in 1980